Mandana Jones is an Anglo-Iranian actress best known for her role as prisoner Nikki Wade on the British television series, Bad Girls.

Biography
Mandana Jones was born on 26 February 1967 to a Welsh father and an Iranian mother.  She is the youngest of three, having two older brothers.  She has a son, Enzo, born on 27 October 2005.

Acting roles
Jones's TV work includes the regional soap London Bridge (shown in certain ITV regions in the UK in the mid-1990s) and the BBC daytime soap Doctors. Probably her most high-profile role is as lesbian lifer Nikki Wade on Bad Girls, in which her on-screen love interest, Helen Stewart, was played by another former cast member of London Bridge, Simone Lahbib.

Her second largest role was in the 2004 BBC TV children's show Powers, where she played Dr. Mary Holland for the duration of the 13-episode series.

Between Bad Girls and Powers, she had a small role in the short, Occasional, Strong (2002).  Other work during this time includes the aforementioned Doctors, where she played Sandra Underwood (2003), BBC's Afternoon Play, Coming Up For Air (2003), Holby City (1 episode, 2003), Born and Bred (1 episode, 2004).  She returned to Doctors in 2005, playing a different character (Ria Ford, 6 episodes), for which she was nominated for Villain of the Year at the British Soap Awards. She then had a small stint as a marriage counsellor Anna Price in EastEnders.

Jones also played a character named Nancy Randall in The Bill during December 2008.

She played a character named Charlotte Thornhill in Casualty on 7 November 2010.

In 2012, she played Dr Broadwood in an episode of Silent Witness.

In April 2016 Mandana worked on Emmerdale as Aaron's solicitor in a case against Aaron's father.

Filmography

References

External links
 
 Mandana Jones fan site - News from agents or Mandana herself!
 Interview with Mandana Jones (10/06)

British soap opera actresses
1967 births
Living people
British people of Iranian descent
English people of Welsh descent